Charles Herman-Wurmfeld (born July 5, 1966) is an American film and television director. He directed the movies Kissing Jessica Stein and Legally Blonde 2: Red, White & Blonde. His sister is producer Eden H. Wurmfeld.

Filmography

References

External links 

American film directors
Living people
LGBT film directors
LGBT television directors
American LGBT screenwriters
1966 births
21st-century LGBT people